The King Mountain Wind Farm is a 278.2  megawatt (MW) wind farm in Upton County, Texas, United States.  214 Siemens 1.3 MW wind turbines  are sited in rows along the south-eastern and north-western edges of a mesa surrounded by deep ravines. The project was completed in December 2001. Annual electricity production is more than 750 GW·h. The wind farm is owned by FPL Energy and the customers for the electricity generated are Reliant Energy (198.9 MW), Austin Energy (76.7 MW) and Texas-New Mexico Power Company (2.6 MW).

Dust, sand and high temperatures place extraordinary demands on the wind turbines. Consequently, the design was modified for the desert-like conditions, providing additional cooling and protection against wind-blown sand.

See also

Wind power in the United States
Wind power in Texas

References

External links
Renewable Energy Systems{}

Energy infrastructure completed in 2001
Wind farms in Texas
Buildings and structures in Upton County, Texas